Imperial University is a higher education institute in Lahore, Pakistan that offers programs in disciplines including Engineering, Management Sciences, Computing, Information Technology, Applied Technology, Social Sciences, Natural Sciences, Commerce, Medicine, Architecture and Fashion Designing.

History
The university was established in 1991 by the Pakistan Benevolence & Social Management Trust. The initial development of IU was supported by academic collaboration with the University of Hull, UK. In 2002, ICBS was chartered by the Govt. of Punjab as independent degree awarding institution (Imperial University Ordinance, 2013).

Academics

School of Business, Economics and Management Sciences
School of Computing and Information Sciences
School of Engineering and Technology
School of Architecture, Art and Design
Faculty of Health & Allied Sciences
Department of English Language and Literature

See also
List of universities in Pakistan

References

External links
Imperial University - official Website

Private universities and colleges in Punjab, Pakistan
Educational institutions established in 1991
Universities and colleges in Lahore
Business schools in Pakistan
1991 establishments in Pakistan